The 2010 Independent Spirit Awards can refer to:
25th Independent Spirit Awards, a ceremony held in 2010, honoring the films of 2009
26th Independent Spirit Awards, a ceremony held in 2011, honoring the films of 2010

Independent Spirit Awards